Below is a list of members of the 17th Bundestag, the lower house of parliament of the Federal Republic of Germany, which convened on 27 October 2009 and was in office until 22 October 2013. The (default) listing is as follows: the states (Bundesländer) in the order of the numbering of the electoral districts; then the parties in the order of their votes (CDU, SPD, FDP, Linke, Grüne, CSU); within the parties' first district winners, then members of the Bundestag via the lists.

Overview 
This summary includes changes in the numbers of the five caucuses (CDU/CSU, SPD, FDP, The Left, Greens):

Current and former members of the Bundestag

Changes in membership

See also 
 Politics of Germany
 List of Bundestag Members

Notes 

17